Stark is an unincorporated community in Butts County, in the U.S. state of Georgia.

History
A post office called Stark was established in 1858, and remained in operation until 1901. The community has the name of James H. Stark, a judge.

References

Unincorporated communities in Georgia (U.S. state)
Unincorporated communities in Butts County, Georgia